Larry O. Johnson (born November 28, 1954) is an American retired basketball player who had a brief career in the National Basketball Association (NBA). He was a 6'3"  shooting guard and played competitively at Kentucky's Union County High School and the University of Kentucky (UK) from 1973 to 1977. He was the first of three African-Americans from Union County recruited by UK.

Johnson was selected in the second round in the 1977 NBA draft by the Buffalo Braves. He played only four games for them in 1977–78 season, averaging 1.5 points per contest.  Johnson would go on to play internationally for many years. Most notably in Japan for Matsushita Denki, which later became known as the Panasonic Corporation, from 1979 to 1989 and eventually coached the team after he retired.

References

External links
 NBA stats @ basketballreference.com
 UK stats @ bigbluehistory.net

1954 births
Living people
African-American basketball players
American expatriate basketball people in Japan
American men's basketball players
Basketball players from Kentucky
Buffalo Braves draft picks
Buffalo Braves players
Kentucky Wildcats men's basketball players
People from Morganfield, Kentucky
Shooting guards
21st-century African-American people
20th-century African-American sportspeople